Dipa Karmakar (born 9 August 1993) is an Indian Gymnast from Tripura State. She is the first gymnast of India who competed in the Olympics. In her debut 2016 Summer Olympics, in the final she reached till 4th position.

At the Rio Olympics, she lost an Olympic medal by just 0.15 points; due to her historic achievement at Rio Olympic, she became a well known Gymnast as well as a face of gymnastics in India. In the final she performed a difficult Prodonova vault and completed against worlds' top Gymnasts such as Simone Biles of United States, Maria Paseka and Giulia Steingrubber, who won Gold, Silver and Bronze medal respectively.

Karmakar first gained attention when she won a bronze medal at the 2014 Commonwealth Games in Glasgow, becoming the first Indian female gymnast to do so in the history of the Games. She also won a bronze medal at the Asian Gymnastics Championships and finished fifth at the 2015 World Artistic Gymnastics Championships, both firsts for her country.

Karmakar represented India at the 2016 Summer Olympics in Rio de Janeiro, becoming the first Indian female gymnast ever to compete in the Olympics, and the first Indian gymnast to do so in 52 years.  She finished in fourth position in Women's Vault Gymnastics event at Rio, with an overall score of 15.066.

In July 2018, she became the first Indian gymnast to win a gold medal at a global event, when she finished first in the vault event of the FIG Artistic Gymnastics World Challenge Cup at Mersin, Turkey.

She is one of the only five women who have successfully landed the Produnova, which is regarded as the most difficult vault of those currently being performed in women's gymnastics.

She is a recipient of the Padma Shri, the fourth highest civilian award in the Republic of India. For her performance in Rio Olympics 2016, the Government of India conferred upon her the Major Dhyan Chand Khel Ratna award in August 2016.

Early life and career
Hailing from Agartala in Tripura, Karmakar started her school life and education in Abhoynagar Nazrul Smriti Vidyalaya; she started practicing gymnastics when she was only 6 years old and has been coached by Soma Nandi & Bishweshwar Nandi since.

When she began gymnastics, Karmakar had flat feet, an undesirable physical trait in a gymnast because it affects their performance.  Through extensive training, she was able to develop an arch in her foot.

In 2008, she won the Junior Nationals in Jalpaiguri. Since 2007, Karmakar has won 77 medals, including 67 gold, in state, national and international championships. She was part of the Indian gymnastics contingent at the 2010 Commonwealth Games in Delhi.

Senior career

Early career (2011–2013)

In February, Karmakar competed in the 2011 National Games of India, representing Tripura. She won gold medals in the all-around and all four events: floor, vault, balance beam and uneven bars.

Commonwealth and Asian medals and WC finals (2014–2015)

In July, at the 2014 Commonwealth Games, Karmakar won a bronze medal in the women's vault final, thanks largely to her Produnova vault, which has a difficulty value of 7.00. She received an average two-vault score of 14.366. She became the first Indian woman to win a Commonwealth Games gymnastics medal, and the second Indian overall, after Ashish Kumar.

At the 2014 Asian Games, Karmakar finished fourth in the vault final with a score of 14.200, behind Hong Un-jong, Oksana Chusovitina, and Phan Thị Hà Thanh.

At the Asian Championships, held in Hiroshima from 31 July – 2 August, Karmakar won the bronze in women's vault while finishing 8th on balance beam.

In October 2015, Karmakar became the first Indian gymnast to qualify for a final stage at the World Artistic Gymnastics Championships. She scored 14.900 on vault in the qualification round to secure her place for the finals, where she finished 5th with a two-vault average of 14.683.

2015 World Artistic Gymnastics Championships

Rio Olympics and further (2016–present) 

On 10 August 2016 at the 2016 Olympic Test Event, Karmakar became the first female gymnast from India to qualify for the final vault event at the Olympics, with a score of 14.833. She missed out on the bronze medal, finishing fourth in the finals of the event with a score of 15.066 on 14 August 2016 at the Gymnastics Center in Rio de Janeiro, Brazil.

Karmakar is only the fifth woman in gymnastics history to land the Produnova vault, or the handspring double front. The Produnova is an artistic gymnastics vault consisting of a front handspring onto the vaulting horse and two front somersaults off. The vault currently has a 6.4 D-score, and is the hardest vault performed in women's artistic gymnastics.

Schedule and 2016 Olympics results 

Karmakar nursed an injury throughout the latter half of 2017; she had injured her knee while practicing for the trials of the 2017 Asian Artistic Gymnastics Championships. She underwent a corrective surgery for her anterior cruciate ligament in April the same year and was unable to participate in any events for the remainder of the competitive season. She also withdrew from the selection trials for the Indian team for the 2018 Commonwealth Games, citing her lack of preparedness. Her coach said that although she was healthy again, the lengthy rehabilitation process had restricted her training.

Karmakar won a gold medal in the vault event of FIG Artistic Gymnastics World Challenge Cup at Mersin, Turkey in July 2018. She thus became the first Indian gymnast to win a gold medal at a global event. In the same competition, she reached the finals of the balance beam event, finishing fourth.

Karmakar failed to qualify for vault final at the 2018 Asian Games. She hurt her right knee, on which she had undergone surgery for an injury, while landing during a practice session ahead of her participation in the women’s qualification for team and apparatus finals. She also pulled out of team final.

Suspension 
In a confirmation from the International Testing Agency in February 2023, it was revealed that Karmakar was serving a 21 month suspension after testing positive for a banned substance and that the suspension would end in mid-July, 2023.

Awards 

 Arjuna Award (2015)
Major Dhyan Chand Khel Ratna Award (2016)
 Padma Shri (2017) - fourth highest Indian national honour.
 2017: Among Forbes’ list of super achievers from Asia under the age of 30.
Dronacharya Award - to her coach Bishweshwar Nandi.
Gold - FIG Artistic Gymnastics World Challenge Cup at Mersin, Turkey
Bronze - FIG Artistic Gymnastics World Cup at Cottbus, Germany

Sponsorship 
Since 2017, Karmakar has been supported by the GoSports Foundation under the Rahul Dravid Athlete Mentorship Programme.

See also

 Sports in India - Overview of sports in India
 Gymnastics in India - Overview of Gymnastics sport in India

References

External links

 
 
 
 
 

1993 births
Living people
Commonwealth Games bronze medallists for India
Gymnasts at the 2010 Asian Games
Gymnasts at the 2014 Asian Games
Gymnasts at the 2018 Asian Games
Gymnasts at the 2014 Commonwealth Games
Gymnasts at the 2016 Summer Olympics
Indian female artistic gymnasts
People from Agartala
Olympic gymnasts of India
Recipients of the Khel Ratna Award
Commonwealth Games medallists in gymnastics
Sportswomen from Tripura
21st-century Indian women
21st-century Indian people
Recipients of the Padma Shri in sports
Asian Games competitors for India
Recipients of the Arjuna Award
Medallists at the 2014 Commonwealth Games